Elymiotis notodontoides, the glossy prominent, is a species of moth in the family Notodontidae (the prominents). It was first described by Francis Walker in 1857 and it is found in North America.

The MONA or Hodges number for Elymiotis notodontoides is 7948.

References

Further reading

 
 
 

Notodontidae
Articles created by Qbugbot
Moths described in 1857